Umezu is a Japanese word. It may refer to a surname, spelled 梅津 or 楳図, or it may have other meanings.

People
Hideyuki Umezu (born 1955), Japanese voice actor
Kazuo Umezu (born 1936), author of Japanese horror manga
Kazutoki Umezu (born 1949), Japanese jazz saxophonist
Yoshijirō Umezu (1882–1949), general in the Imperial Japanese Army in World War II

Other
Umezu (梅酢), the brine produced when preparing umeboshi; although the term translates as "plum vinegar", it is a misnomer.

See also
He-Umezu Agreement (梅津・何応欽協定), a secret agreement between the Empire of Japan and the Republic of China concluded on 10 June 1935